John Barr Bell (5 April 1901 – 31 May 1973) was an English footballer who played as a winger.

Club career
A doctor by trade, Bell played football professionally with Chelsea in the early 1920s, between spells in Scotland with Queen's Park and Hamilton Academical.

References

1901 births
1973 deaths
Footballers from Barrow-in-Furness
English footballers
Association football forwards
Queen's Park F.C. players
Chelsea F.C. players
Hamilton Academical F.C. players
Cowdenbeath F.C. players